Wards Grove Township is one of twenty-three townships in Jo Daviess County, Illinois, USA.  As of the 2010 census, its population was 224 and it contained 103 housing units.

Geography

Cemeteries
The township contains Blair Cemetery.

Major highways
  U.S. Route 20.
  Illinois Route 78.

Airports and landing strips
 Providence Place Field (99IL).

Demographics

School districts
 Pearl City Community Unit School District 200.
 Stockton Community Unit School District 206.

Political districts
 Illinois' 16th congressional district.
 State House District 89.
 State Senate District 45.

References
 
 United States Census Bureau 2007 TIGER/Line Shapefiles.
 United States National Atlas.

External links
 Jo Daviess County official site.
 City-Data.com.
 Illinois State Archives.
 Township Officials of Illinois.

Townships in Jo Daviess County, Illinois
Townships in Illinois